Verkhnearmetovo (Ürge Ärmet) is a rural locality (a village) in Armetovsky Selsoviet, Ishimbaysky District, Bashkortostan, Russia. The population was 382 as of 2010. There are 2 streets.

Geography 
Verkhnearmetovo is located 57 km northeast of Ishimbay (the district's administrative centre) by road. Nizhnearmetovo is the nearest rural locality.

References 

Rural localities in Ishimbaysky District